The Setia Alam Highway or Persiaran Setia Alam is a major highway in Selangor, Malaysia. It is also a main route to New Klang Valley Expressway via Setia Alam Interchange

The Kilometre Zero of the Setia Alam Highway starts at Setia Alam Interchange of the New Klang Valley Expressway E1.

History
The highway was built by S P Setia Berhad which developed Setia Alam, a new township in Shah Alam. It was constructed in 2004 and was completed in 2006. The highway was opened to traffic on 14 July 2006 alongside the official opening of the new Setia Alam Interchange of the New Klang Valley Expressway.

At most sections, the highway was built under the JKR R5 road standard, allowing maximum speed limit of up to 90 km/h.

List of interchanges 

Highways in Malaysia